Richard Harold Betteley (14 July 1880 – 3 August 1942) was an English footballer who played for both Black Country clubs, Wolverhampton Wanderers and West Bromwich Albion.

Betteley turned professional in August 1901 when he joined First Division Wolverhampton Wanderers from nearby non-league side Bilston United. He made his Football League debut on 28 March 1902 in a 3–5 defeat at Notts County. He held his place in the team and missed just two games over the next two seasons, but found himself under pressure for his place in the 1905–06 campaign. He left for local rivals West Bromwich Albion at the season's end as Wolves dropped out of the top flight.

He made his Albion debut in September 1906 in a Second Division match away at Burnley. He won a Second Division championship medal with the club in 1910–11 campaign, but failed to make the team that played in the 1912 FA Cup Final. He left Albion in May 1912 to rejoin Bilston United, before retiring in May 1914.

He died in Wolverhampton on 3 August 1942.

References
 
 

1880 births
1942 deaths
Footballers from Wolverhampton
People from Sedgley
English footballers
Association football defenders
Bilston Town F.C. players
Wolverhampton Wanderers F.C. players
West Bromwich Albion F.C. players
English Football League players